Landgraaf is a municipality in southeastern Limburg, Netherlands, forming part of the Parkstad Limburg agglomeration. Snow World is the largest indoor ski piste in Europe.

Population centres 
Nieuwenhagen
Schaesberg
Ubach over Worms

Topography

Dutch topographic map of the municipality of Landgraaf, June 2015

Special information 
A pop music festival called Pinkpop is held annually on the Pentecost weekend in Schaesberg, a town in Landgraaf.

Landgraaf is home to the largest indoor ski piste in Europe, called Snow World.

Notable natives 

 Johan Kremers (born 1933 in Nieuwenhagen) a Queen's Commissioner of Limburg from 1977 to 1990
 Harry Kempen (1937 in Nieuwenhagen – 2000) a cultural psychologist and academic
 Joep Lange (1954 in Nieuwenhagen – 2014) a Dutch clinical researcher in HIV therapy, International AIDS Society from 2002 to 2004
 Annemarie Mol (born 1958 in Schaesberg) a Dutch ethnographer, philosopher and academic
 Henk Blezer (born 1961 in Schaesberg) a Dutch Tibetologist, Indologist, and scholar of Buddhist studies
 Sharon Walraven (born 1970 in Schaesberg) a Dutch wheelchair tennis player, silver medallist at the 2000 Paralympics and gold medallist at the 2008 Paralympics
 Carach Angren (formed 2003 in Landgraaf) is a symphonic black metal band

See also 
List of mayors of Landgraaf

Gallery

References

External links

Official website

 
Municipalities of Limburg (Netherlands)
South Limburg (Netherlands)